The 1997–98 season was the 92nd season in the existence of AJ Auxerre and the club's 18th consecutive season in the top-flight of French football. In addition to the domestic league, Auxerre participated in this season's editions of the Coupe de France, the Coupe de la Ligue, the UEFA Intertoto Cup and UEFA Cup.

Season summary
Auxerre dropped one place in the final table to 7th. They had better success in the cup competitions, reaching the semi-finals of the Coupe de la Ligue and the quarter-finals of the UEFA Cup, winning the Intertoto Cup in the process. Instrumental to Auxerre's success was the form of Stéphane Guivarc'h, who scored 21 league goals to win the Golden Boot; Guivarc'h added 24 further goals across the cups to finish with an astonishing 45 goals in all competitions.

Players

First-team squad
Squad at end of season

Reserves

Competitions

Division 1

League table

Results summary

Results by round

Intertoto Cup

Group stage

Semi-finals

Finals

UEFA Cup

First round

Second round

Third round

Quarter-finals

References

AJ Auxerre seasons
Auxerre